Gol Dulatshahi (also Romanized as Gol Dūlatshāhī; also known as Ḩājjīābād) is a village in Honam Rural District, in the Central District of Selseleh County, Lorestan Province, Iran. At the 2006 census, its population was 203, in 37 families.

References 

Towns and villages in Selseleh County